Basil was the first Duke of Naples from 661 to 666. Neapolitan by birth, soldier of the Byzantine Empire by trade, he was nominated by the emperor Constans II to be dux Campaniae in 661.

Sources
Naples in the Dark Ages by David Taylor and Jeff Matthews.

7th-century dukes of Naples
7th-century Byzantine people
Patricii